Side-side-side is a means of analyzing triangles discussed at:
Solution of triangles#Three sides given (SSS)
SSS postulate